President Elect is a turn-based, political simulation game, first released by Strategic Simulations for the Apple II in 1981, followed by a Commodore 64 port in 1984.

Description
President Elect gives the player the ability to play as various real historical, potential historical, or completely fictional presidential candidates during the Presidential campaigns from 1960 to 1984 (most versions also included the 1988 campaign).  Players were given the option of playing a "Historical" or "Ahistorical" scenario for each of the given years.  Under the "Historical" option, the candidates, as well as economic and foreign policy conditions, and the status of the incumbent, were fixed.  During an "Ahistorical" session, all those variables could be determined by the player (for example, the player could choose a 1984 race between an incumbent Republican President Ronald Reagan, versus a Democratic Senator Edward M. Kennedy, in the midst of an unpopular war and an economic boom).  Alternatively, players could select the option of creating a fictional presidential candidate (or a real candidate from outside of the game's timeframe), through the selection of various political, personal, and geographic attributes (somewhat in the manner of creating an RPG player character).  In addition, there was the option of selecting an "Ahistorical" set of candidates within the otherwise "Historical" conditions of the selected year.  The game came preset with not only all the major candidates of the elections covered by the span of the game, but also a number of hypothetical candidates from across the time frame, such as Jerry Brown, George Romney, Gary Hart, and Howard Baker.

The game could be played with either two or three candidates (for example, the "Historical" scenarios for 1968 and 1980 included third party candidates George C. Wallace and John Anderson, respectively, and "Ahistorical" scenarios for any year could include the addition of a third party candidate), and the computer could control any or all of the candidates (thus allowing for the possibility of a non-player, straight simulation of an electoral scenario), meaning the game could be played by one, two, or three players.

Gameplay centered on the activity of dispersing PAPs ("Political Action Points"), which were approximately equivalent to campaign funds, in terms of their relationship to real life presidential campaigning, as well as scheduling personal, campaign visits to various states.  Additionally, at the end of each of the nine, week-long, post-Labor Day game turns, there was a potential debate phase.

The role of the vice-presidential running mate was extremely limited, in that the running mate's identity was never given, but rather was simply represented by his or her being from a particular state, thus giving the ticket an electoral advantage in that particular state, and to a lesser extent in the other states within the region of the running mate's home state (for purposes of the game, the country was broken up into seven different regions, corresponding to: New England, the Mid-Atlantic, the South, the Industrial Midwest, the Great Plains, the Mountain States, and the Pacific Coastal States), although the vice presidential candidate's role in any state or region other than his own is nonexistent. But, he can tour foreign countries which if favourable gives an advantage in the elections. Foreign tour can also be performed by presidential candidate. But it shortens the election campaign that can be taken up by him for that particular week depending on the number of days the tour is taken up. Foreign tour costs PAPs depending on the number of days. A failed foreign tour can negatively impact polls, while a successful tour can cause a given candidate to see a polling surge.

Reception
Computer Gaming World found in 1981 that incumbency was the most important factor in winning elections in the original version of President Elect. The review began with the results of a simulated election in which Ronald Reagan won reelection in 1984 with 525 electoral votes from 49 states and 55% of the popular vote, versus Walter Mondale's 13 electoral votes (from Washington, D.C. and Minnesota) and 44%. The results of the real 1984 election were very similar, with the same candidates receiving the same electoral votes from the same states, and a 59%/41% popular vote.

In 1996, Computer Gaming World declared President Elect the 131st-best computer game ever released.

Reviews
The V.I.P. of Gaming Magazine #2 (Feb./March, 1986)
Moves #60, p18

See also
 The Political Machine series

References

External links
Review in GAMES magazine

1981 video games
1984 video games
Apple II games
Commodore 64 games
Government simulation video games
Strategic Simulations games
Presidential elections in the United States
United States presidential elections in popular culture
Video games developed in the United States
Video games set in the United States
Video games set in the 1960s
Video games set in the 1970s
Video games set in the 1980s
Multiplayer and single-player video games